John Meehan SJ is a Canadian Jesuit priest, historian and academic. He is Director of the Bill Graham Centre for Contemporary International History at Trinity College, University of Toronto. He was president and vice-chancellor of the University of Sudbury in Sudbury, Ontario, Canada from September 2019 until 2021.

  He was formerly rector of the Church of the Gesù in Montreal and president of Campion College in Regina, Saskatchewan, Canada.

Education
He has a Ph.D. from the University of Toronto, and a B.A. in history and Russian studies from McGill University. He speaks English, French, Russian and Japanese.

References

External links

1967 births
20th-century Canadian Jesuits
Canadian university and college chief executives
Academic staff of the University of Regina
Academic staff of Laurentian University
Academic staff of the University of Toronto
University of Toronto alumni
McGill University alumni
Living people
21st-century Canadian Jesuits